The Belgian Scrabble Federation (BSF) is an association for Belgian Scrabble players (playing in French). The federation has approximately 1,000 members in 60 clubs, and was the first federation for Francophone Scrabble players, founded in 1972, before the unified French Scrabble Federation and the International Francophone Scrabble Federation. As of 2012, the president is Éric Leurquin.

The BSF maintains the national ranking of Francophone Scrabble players and organizes many tournaments of classic Scrabble and Duplicate Scrabble in Belgium. Among these tournaments is the Belgian Francophone Scrabble Championship, which takes place during the Festival de Belgique.

The BSF is a member of the International Francophone Scrabble Federation, and so its members may enter tournaments in any Francophone country. Many Belgian players have qualified for the French World Scrabble Championships which takes place each year in a different city.

Awards
The most recent (2011) winner of the Belgian Scrabble Championships is Christian Pierre, having won the title 14 times since his first win in 1997. Pierre has also won the French World Scrabble Championships five times, in 1991, 1992, 1994, 1996, and 1998. The most recent World Championship win by a Belgian was Éric Vennin in 2008, in Dakar. Other World Champions include Marc Selis (twice), Hippolyte Wouters, Agnès Lempereur, and Yvon Duval.

Since the BSF's founding, the Individual World Championships have been dominated by Belgians. The first Individual World Champion (Hippolyte Wouters), as well as the first Pairs World Champions, were Belgian. However, Christian Pierre is the only Belgian to win since 1978. No Belgian has yet won the Blitz Championship; Jean-Luc Dives came third in 2006.

References

External links

Scrabble Federation, Belgian
Organizations established in 1972
1972 establishments in Belgium